Pine Point Beach is a four-mile municipal beach located on the northern edge of Saco Bay in Scarborough, Maine, United States. It spans the outlet of the Scarborough River. It covers a total of just over three acres and has 7,000 feet of sandy ocean frontage. It also includes a sensitive sand dune system and a significant number of nearby commercial and residential buildings.

References

Beaches of Maine
Scarborough, Maine
Landforms of Cumberland County, Maine